This is a list of organizations with a primary, or significant, commitment to ending human trafficking.

List

 8th Day Center for Justice, a Roman Catholic organization based in Chicago, Illinois
 A21 Campaign, a 501(c)(3) nonprofit, non-governmental organization that works to fight human trafficking
 ACT Alberta, a Canadian coalition of Government of Alberta representatives, non-governmental organizations, community organisations, and the Royal Canadian Mounted Police
After Exploitation, a nonprofit organisation tracking hidden evidence on the mistreatment of slavery survivors based in the UK
 Agape International Missions, a nonprofit organization in Cambodia
 Anti-Slavery International, works at local, national and international levels to eliminate all forms of slavery around the world 
 Arizona League to End Regional Trafficking, a coalition representing partnerships with law enforcement, faith-based communities, nonprofit organizations, social service agencies, attorneys and concerned citizens
 Awareness Against Human Trafficking (HAART), a non-governmental organization fighting against human trafficking in Kenya
 A Better World, based in Lacombe, Alberta, Canada
 British Red Cross, the United Kingdom body of the worldwide neutral and impartial humanitarian network
 California Against Slavery, a human rights organization directed at strengthening California state laws to protect victims of sex trafficking
 Chab Dai, a coalition founded by Helen Sworn that connects Christian organizations committed to ending sexual abuse and trafficking
 Challenging Heights, a grassroots, survivor-led NGO dedicated to ending child trafficking, reducing child slavery, and promoting children's rights in Ghana
 Coalition Against Trafficking in Women, an international non-governmental organization opposing human trafficking, prostitution, and other forms of commercial sex
 Coalition to Abolish Slavery and Trafficking, a nonprofit Los Angeles-based anti-human trafficking organization
 Covenant House, a large privately-funded agency in the Americas providing shelter, food, immediate crisis care, and other services to homeless and runaway youth.
 DeliverFund, a nonprofit intelligence organization that leverages cutting-edge technology in the fight against human trafficking in the US.
 Devatop Centre for Africa Development, a nonprofit organization in Nigeria with focus on combating human trafficking, gender-based violence, and child abuse; and providing educational support to vulnerable children
 Development and Education Programme for Daughters and Communities Centre in the Greater Mekong Subregion (DEPDC/GMS), a non-profit NGO based in Chiang Rai Province, Northern Thailand, that works to prevent and protect children and youth from being trafficked into exploitative labor conditions
 Durbar Mahila Samanwaya Committee, a collective of 65,000 sex workers in West Bengal
 ECPAT, an international non-governmental organisation and network headquartered in Thailand which is designed to end the commercial sexual exploitation of children
 EVE, an advocacy group based in Vancouver, British Columbia, Canada
 The Exodus Road, a non-profit coalition of organizations specialized in the intervention component of human trafficking, training and funding partnerships with local authorities to actively rescue people trapped in human trafficking in India, southeast Asia, and the United States
 Face to Face Bulgaria, an organization whose primary mission is to prevent cases of forced prostitution and human trafficking in Bulgaria
 Free the Slaves, dedicated to ending slavery worldwide
 Freeset, whose primary mission is to provide sustainable employment and economic empowerment to victims of sex trafficking in South Asia
 GABRIELA, a leftist Filipino organization that advocates for women's issues
 Girls Educational and Mentoring Services, a nonprofit organization that provides services to commercially sexually exploited and domestically trafficked girls and young women, based in Harlem, New York
 Global Alliance Against Traffic in Women, a network of more than 100 non-governmental organisations from all regions of the world, who share a deep concern for the women, children and men whose human rights have been violated by the criminal practice of trafficking in persons
 Global Centurion, an anti-trafficking organization fighting human trafficking by focusing on demand, based in Washington, D.C., United States
 Hope for Justice, which identifies and rescues victims, advocates on their behalf, provides restorative care which rebuilds lives and trains frontline professionals to tackle slavery
 Ing Makababaying Aksyon, a feminist service institution that seeks to empower women and work for a society that genuinely recognises and upholds women's rights
 International Justice Mission, a U.S.-based non-profit human rights organization that operates in countries all over the world to rescue victims of individual human rights abuse
 Love146, works to end child trafficking and exploitation through prevention education and survivor care.
 Maiti Nepal, a nonprofit organization in Nepal dedicated to helping victims of sex trafficking
 Mongolian Gender Equality Center, a non-governmental organization based in Ulaanbaatar, Mongolia
 NASHI, a Saskatoon, Saskatchewan, Canada-based organisation that opposes human trafficking by raising awareness through education
 Office to Combat Trafficking in Persons, a government agency responsible for coordinating efforts to address human trafficking in British Columbia, Canada
 Operation Underground Railroad
 Physicians for Human Rights
 Polaris, a nonprofit, non-governmental organization that works to combat and prevent modern day slavery and human trafficking
 PREDA Foundation, a charitable organization that was founded in Olongapo City, Philippines, in 1974
 Prerana, a non-governmental organization (NGO) that works in the red-light districts of Mumbai, India, to protect children vulnerable to commercial sexual exploitation and trafficking. The organization runs three night care centers for children at risk, as well as shelter homes and a residential training center for girls rescued from the trafficking trade.
 Ratanak International, an organisation that rescues children from sexual slavery and then provides them with education, rehabilitation, and safety
 Reaching Out Romania, a non-governmental charitable organization in Romania that helps girls ages 13 to 22 exit the sex industry
 Redlight Children Campaign, a nonprofit organization created by New York lawyer and president of Priority Films Guy Jacobson and Israeli actress Adi Ezroni in 2002 to combat worldwide child sexual exploitation and human trafficking
 Renew Foundation, a Christian nonprofit non-government organization in the Philippines dedicated to empowering female survivors of human trafficking and prostitution in the Philippines
 Ricky Martin Foundation, an organization with the mission to advocate for the well-being of children around the world
 Ride for Refuge, a cycling event that raises awareness and funds for displaced persons, including human trafficking victims
 Run for Courage, a nonprofit organization that combats human trafficking
 Shared Hope International, a 501(c)(3) nonprofit organization which exists to rescue and restore women and children in crisis
 Slavery Footprint, a nonprofit organization based in Oakland, California, that works to end human trafficking and modern-day slavery
 Stop Child Trafficking Now, an organization founded by Lynette Lewis, an author and public speaker 
 Stop the Traffik, a campaign coalition which aims to bring an end to human trafficking worldwide
 The RINJ Foundation,  (RINJ or RINJ Women) is a Canadian incorporated global not-for-profit health care-related non-governmental organization women's group listed with the United Nations as an NGO RINJ Women have investigated and prosecuted child slavery rings in Iraq, Ukraine, Philippines, Afghanistan and Syria. RINJ launches a global campaign titled: Don’t Buy A Kid! ~ End Child Sex Trade each year reminding potential purchasers of children that they are being watched and will eventually be caught. RINJ operates safe houses, Women's Shelters and rape clinics around the world.
Third World Movement Against the Exploitation of Women, an organization directed towards the liberation of women from all kinds of oppression and exploitation based on sex, race or class
 Thorn, aka Digital Defenders of Children; Ashton Kutcher's organization driving tech innovation to fight child trafficking and the sexual exploitation of children
 Truckers Against Trafficking, a nonprofit organization that trains truck drivers to recognize and report instances of human trafficking
 Unlikely Heroes, a nonprofit that rescues and restores child victims of slavery worldwide and places them in their seven safe homes in the Philippines, Thailand, Mexico, and the United States
 Vital Voices, an international, nonprofit, non-governmental organization that works with women leaders in the areas of economic empowerment, women's political participation, and human rights
 Voice of the Free, a nonprofit, non-stock and tax-exempt non-government organization in the Philippines established in 1991

References

External links
 List of Canadian organizations via the government of British Columbia

 Global Modern Slavery Directory

Lists of organizations
Slavery-related lists